Grant Mitchell may refer to:

Grant Mitchell (actor) (1874–1957), American stage and film actor
Grant Mitchell (politician) (born 1951), Canadian politician and businessman
Grant Mitchell (EastEnders), a fictional character from the British soap opera EastEnders
Grant Mitchell (Home and Away), a fictional character from the Australian soap opera Home and Away